The Slashers are one of six teams currently competing in SlamBall.

History
The Slashers and 3 others joined the Rumble and Mob in the first ever Slamball season. They failed to make the playoffs but in 2003 Season they made it to the championship game against the Riders, where they lost 66–60. When Slamball returned in 2008 the Slashers changed their colors from Maroon and Aqua to White and Red. That season they finished with a 7–5 record and beat the Rumble 48–46 to win their first championship. This made them the first team to compete in back-to-back championship games.

Season-by-season

Personnel

Head coaches

Current roster

Trivia
During season 6 of One Tree Hill there was a five episode storyline where Nathan plays SlamBall for the Slashers.

Slamball
Sports clubs established in 2002